Route 500, or Glasgow Airport Express is a bus route in Glasgow that operates between the city centre and Glasgow Airport.

History 
The service was originally known as Glasgow Shuttle and was introduced January 2011. A new fleet of ten Alexander Dennis Enviro200 MMC single-decker buses entered service on the route on 21 July 2016.

On 14 April 2019, ten new Alexander Dennis Enviro400 City double-decker buses entered service on the route.

Services 
The services starts at Buchanan bus station and runs via the M8 motorway. It was originally run 24 hours per day but operating hours were cut back during the COVID-19 pandemic. Services were restored in mid 2022.

References

See also 

 Glasgow Flyer

Bus routes in Scotland
Transport in Glasgow
Airport bus services